The 2017–18 season was Cheltenham Town's 131st season in existence and their second consecutive season in League Two. Along with competing in League Two, the club also participated in the FA Cup, EFL Cup and EFL Trophy.

The season covered the period from 1 July 2017 to 30 June 2018.

Competitions

Friendlies

League Two

League table

FA Cup

EFL Cup

EFL Trophy

Group table

Transfers

In

Out

Loan in

Loan out

Squad statistics
Source:

Numbers in parentheses denote appearances as substitute.
Players with squad numbers struck through and marked  left the club during the playing season.
Players with names in italics and marked * were on loan from another club for the whole of their season with Cheltenham.
Players listed with no appearances have been in the matchday squad but only as unused substitutes.
Key to positions: GK – Goalkeeper; DF – Defender; MF – Midfielder; FW – Forward

Footnotes
A.  After extra time.

References

Cheltenham Town
Cheltenham Town F.C. seasons